John Call Cook (April 7, 1918 – October 12, 2012) was an American geophysicist who played a crucial role in establishing the field of ground-penetrating radar and is generally regarded as contributing the fundamental research to develop the field. Cook is also known for demonstrating that aerial surveys can map surface radioactivity to enable much more efficient prospecting for uranium ore, for inventing electrostatic detection of hazardous ice crevasses, and for developing other novel techniques in remote sensing.

During most of his professional career, Cook specialized in the techniques of remote sensing and the detection of underground objects.

Early years 

John Call Cook was born on April 7, 1918 in Afton, Wyoming, to Carl and Ella Cook.  Carl made his living as an attorney and farmer, and was himself the son of Phineas Wolcott Cook and number 4 wife, Johanna.

During his teens, John constructed various devices including a spark-gap device, a batteryless crystal radio, a six-inch telescope, and an underwater 'diving helmet' constructed of a cookie can with plastic sheet bolted and gasketed for vision, powered by a garden hose and three tire pumps ganged together.

University

Undergraduate 

Cook initially studied at Brigham Young University then enrolled with the University of Utah to study Physics. In the Spring of 1941 Cook began work as lab assistant at the university, and graduated that same year.

The war years

As a physics major during the war, Cook was recruited to work at the Radiation Lab at MIT where he was assigned to work in the "Experimental Systems Group - 44" under Dr. James L. Lawson in the Roof Laboratory. This group worked on advanced problems of radar systems, such as signal discernibility, anti-jamming, short pulses, and receiver design. For some time afterward this group's experimental systems led the field in performance—its members were continually breaking new ground and extending the range of radar's capabilities.

They used an S-band (10 cm wavelength) and an X-band (3 cm) set, each with several kinds of display, and later received a K-band set (1 cm) which could resolve the structure of a nearby gasholder. These sets had around 300 vacuum tubes each, and 10 to 20 adjustment knobs each, and many interconnecting cables.  Nearly every day a vacuum tube would fail, and they would have to trace and troubleshoot.

They often tracked a B-17 bomber sent from Bedford Airfield for their use, trying variations in frequency and polarization, the use of chaff and jamming countermeasures, and trying to evaluate the use of propeller modulation signal amplitude to identify friendly versus hostile.

M.I.T Rocket Research Society 

Cook was elected president of the Rocket Research Society, a special-interest club, at the Radiation Lab.

The American Rocket Society in New York had shut down for the duration of the war, but the M.I.T group continued development of liquid-fueled rockets.  Cook built a portable test stand from a wooden box, with a thrust gauge, tanks for fuel and oxidizer, valves with long control rods, and electric ignition.  John, Bob Smith, and others built rocket motors of steel, aluminum, ceramic, silver from coins, etc., using the lathes and other facilities of the M.I.T Student Model Shop, where some of the members maintained the precarious good will of the man in charge.

Some of their number managed to obtain liquid oxygen from the nearby Arthur D. Little company, which was developing a portable military "lox" generator and was dumping excess product fuming and freezing everything, into the gutter.  The club hauled it to their test site in 5-gallon steel cans insulated with fiber mat.  This gave their most successful test—the rocket motor roared with a ten-foot plume of flame filled with standing shock waves, with the thrust gauge off-scale for ten seconds or more.  But the aluminum motor burned out its throat and set the test stand on fire, which they put out with a Pyrene hand fire extinguisher.  However the carbon tetrachloride produced phosgene and chlorine gasses (they deduced), which corroded all the metal.

They still had gallons of liquid oxygen left, and so decided to make an explosion.  The blast shot a board 50 feet in the air end-over-end, and embedded gravel in the chest of the fuse-lighter, even with Cook's efforts at safety. This episode was exaggerated in MIT's humor magazine, where Cook was portrayed as the nonchalant "Lon Crook".

In spring 1945 they received news of the German V-2 rocket-propelled ballistic missiles striking Britain.  The German Rocket Society, with their government's support, had continued the work of American Robert Goddard and were far ahead of the U.S.  However, their large, successful rockets had been applied at once to military purposes.  Cook was disgusted with this and so lost interest in rockets until NASA was formed. When it also developed that he would soon be leaving Cambridge, he resigned as president of the MIT Rocket Research Society and turned it over to Robert Kraichnan, who would later become prominent in relativity.

Master of Science 

In the Fall of 1945 Cook applied for and received a graduate assistantship at Penn State and began work on a master's degree.  During his second year there he was appointed to teach Prof. Weber's junior year Thermal Laboratory course.  Cook read extensively in the Physics Library on gravitational topics, developed a thesis plan, and performed a program of experiments using an Eötvös torsion balance (an extremely sensitive gravity-sensing instrument) owned by the Geophysics Department in the Mineral Industries building.  Prof. Sylvain Pirson there was pleased with the modifications Cook had made to improve the sensitivity of the balance, and with his administration of the course.  However Prof. Duncan, the department head, advised Cook that as he'd had serious difficulty with some important mathematical physics courses, it was recommended that he leave with the MS and not come back.

Graduated in 1947 at age 29.  Somewhat in shock from the experiences of his Master's, Cook drove home.  He met L.V.S. Roos of Texaco, who headed a crew doing seismic prospecting for oil in the Utah area, and was hired on as Assistant Recorder at $300/month.  Early each morning their crew of 8 would drive out with the recording truck, a drill-hole rig, and a water tanker to various sites marked by a survey crew.  The drill crew made a 3" hole up to 150' deep and emplaced a dynamite charge.  They laid out numerous cables 1,000' around the radius of the recorder truck and attached geophones connected at intervals.  Then a preliminary charge would be set off to 'spring' the hole, and then the main shot was made, requiring many switches to be thrown in a special order.  This all required concentration and care as, once blown the hole could not be used anymore, and Cook was soon promoted for getting good data.  Having a master's degree, Cook was treated as someone special by visiting Texaco officials and Mr. Roos, and it was suggested that he could be a Crew Chief or could be asked to join the laboratory staff in Houston.  These successes and being with family, had restored Cook's confidence.

PhD 

In late Fall, 1947 Cook received a telegram from Prof. Pirson at Penn State offering him a job in the Geophysics Department as a Research Assistant for $170/mo, to work on a PhD in Geophysics.  Tuition would be only a nominal fee, and colder weather meant working on the field crew would be unpleasant, so Cook immediately accepted the opportunity. On arrival at Penn State he moved back into the Graduate Club and was accepted into the PhD program.  Cook was made responsible for the earthquake seismograph station so learned how to run it, read the records, and send reports to Washington.  At Prof. Pirson's request he built their first vertical-component seismometer and arranged for visible-ink recording of its output upstairs in their offices, so they no longer had to develop photographic records to know when an earthquake was happening anywhere on Earth.

In the Winter of 1949 Cook attempted to complete an experiment begun during his master's work: to detect a tangential gravitational field purportedly produced around a rotating body (according to certain published theories).  He had not found it with the small centrifuge in the Mineral Processing lab, so arranged to work with the massive turbine rotors at the Westinghouse Plant Apparatus Division, Atomic Power Plant Equipment, east of Pittsburgh, Pa.  He drove to the plant several times with the Eötvös torsion balance in the back, and set it up close to one of the newly made rotors while it was being balanced at 3,600rpm on the giant factory floor.  The balance needed to settle for an hour, and Cook needed one reading with the rotor stationary, then another with it turning at full speed;  however random vibrations, the starting and stopping for tuning, and heating and cooling to simulate operating conditions made stable readings difficult.  Westinghouse engineers showed Cook blueprints of the building, which had a floor of great cast-iron plates 6" thick, resting on brick piers on bedrock.  It could hardly be more sturdy, yet still vibrated from the machinery.  Cook tried damping spurious modes by filling the delicate instrument with alcohol, but this induced more instabilities, possibly from thermal currents.  During his final attempt at Westinghouse Cook was told that a famous engineer in the research lab wanted to see him, Joseph Slepian, who asked about the theoretical basis of a tangential gravitational field, and proceeded to cast doubt as it's not an effect predicted by Einstein's General Relativity.  Cook could not debate the matter and so gave up the pursuit.

Also during that Winter and at Pirson's request, Cook built a model of an oil well with an electric logging system.  This yielded data and curves which Prof. Pirson felt should be published, so Cook wrote Laboratory Tests of Electrolog Resistivity Interpretation, which was published in The Producers Monthly.  On the strength of that research Pirson nominated Cook for membership in Sigma Xi, the national research honorary, in which Cook remained a lifelong member.

Pirson then arranged for Cook to take over a research project for the Penn Grade Crude Association (a small group of oil firms in northwest Pennsylvania) with a salary of $300/mo and promotion to Research Associate.  Another Research Associate, Bacon, and Cook were left with teaching all of the Geophysics courses;  Bacon taught most, while Cook taught General Geochemistry for Fall-Winter, 1948-9 and worked in research.  At the end of the school year, Pirson left the university for a better paying job with an oil company in Tulsa, OK.  All in the department were sorry to see this professor go.

During the Winter-Spring of 1948-9 Cook did field work in the oilfields around Bradford in northwestern Pennsylvania as part of the Penn Grade research.  These fields are famous for producing high-grade petroleum which is refined into Quaker State, Pennzoil and other superior brands.  Cook saw the actual drilling and logging processes, although most wells were 30–50 years old with decrepit and rusty pumping equipment.  A central engine running on natural gas (from the wells) in a shack, with steel rods radiating out to wells all around (as much as 500' away), rocking back and forth on the ground or on stands.  Here, Cook conceived an improvement in electric logging technique: a thin-sheet current path controlled by 'shielding-current' electrodes, analogous to the Kelvin potential shields he had learned about at the University of Utah.  He built a model, which did indeed greatly improve the vertical resolution of the resistivity logging.  Cook considered getting a patent, but soon learned that a similar system had been developed by another sole inventor and Schlumberger Well Surveying Corp, who were involved in patent litigation with one another.

Thesis 
Prospecting for uranium had just become popular and, because the government had guaranteed to buy
any uranium found, at an attractive price. Vast areas of the U.S. had never been explored for uranium, and a few lucky individuals became rich by finding ores with simply a geiger counter. Cook saw aerial prospecting as a new field of Geophysics, which needed analysis, so this became his thesis topic. How fast must the detector operate? How high and how fast could one fly? How small could a deposit of ore be and still be detected? How badly would the geophysical anomaly be smeared and weakened by overburden and by the air? How serious is the interference from cosmic rays and background radioactivity? Cook was soon able to answer most of these questions with elaborate calculations based on library studies. However it was necessary to check and verify the calculations by model and full-scale experiments, insofar as this was possible.

The Geophysics department had just bought a small, portable geiger counter, which did respond well to the gamma rays coming from rock samples Cook had gathered from the Mauch Chunk camotite outcrop. One could get crude quantitative data by counting the audible "clicks" it produced over a minute's time. In this way, a gamma-ray "profile" of an ore stockpile at a uranium refinery at Rifle, Colorado was obtained during Cook's trip West in the summer of 1950. The ore was clearly detectable at a distance of a quarter-mile. However, it was known that equipment of much greater sensitivity would be needed for a practical airborne survey. In fact, scintillation detectors having both a much larger cross-
section and much higher detection efficiency were already in airborne use in Canada and by the U.S. Geological Survey, although many of the details were secret.

Cook attempted to cast a large sodium iodide crystal in a glass baking dish, using one of the Department ovens, with poor results. (it's an art)  With limited funds, he secured a large geiger-mueller tube 18 inches long, one inch in diameter, which was adequate for his thesis experiments. He developed the needed accessory circuits (high-voltage source and amplifiers, all battery-powered, a borrowed mechanical pulse counter, and 400 ft of lightweight, high-voltage twin cable on a portable reel). With this equipment Cook found the effect of height on the gamma ray field from the soil (using flagpoles). He also ran fairly accurate (1.5%) radiation profiles at various heights over several gamma-ray sources: boxes of ore, the Mauch Chunk uranium deposit, and 0.1 gram of pure radium borrowed from a hospital! Heights up to 300 ft. were achieved using 6-foot hydrogen-filled balloons from the Meteorology department to lift the detector, preamplifier and cable. This work occupied much of the Winter and Spring of 1950–51. Cook wrote a careful thesis of over 100 pages, with 29 figures, which wife Vi typed in 3 copies, and was approved by the committee.

Cook continued teaching, including developing a new course in Oil Well Logging methods (electric resistivity, self-potential, gamma-ray, neutron, sonic velocity, etc.), which he taught to about 20 Geophysics seniors. He also tried to invent a gravity gradiometer for rock-density logging, however his first model using mercury and oil columns in glass tubes, showed the obvious fact that any ROTATION is equivalent to a gravity gradient, and a stabilized mounting is required. So Cook had to give up on this for an indefinite time.

In 1951 Cook was the first PhD in Geophysics to graduate from Penn State University.  By this time he had produced three articles which challenged existing thinking of the time, "Laboratory Tests of Electrolog Resistivity Interpretation", "Characteristics of Reservoir Models by Resistivity Logging", and "Can Gravity Be Abolished?".  His doctoral dissertation, "An Analysis of Airborne Surveying for Surface Radioactivity", was also published in the primary journal for the field, Geophysics.

Professional life

Finding employment 
His education nearly complete, Cook wrote letters offering his services to several oil companies and other labs (the natural employers of geophysicists) located in the subtropical Southwest, as wife Vi needed warmer climate. He received five invitations to interviews in the Spring of 1951.

In Tulsa at the Stanolind Oil Co. where Dr. Pirson worked, Cook got on well with Dr. Dan Silverman (Chief Geophysicist), but inexplicably never got a formal offer from them. In Dallas the Magnolia Petroleum Co. gave him a thorough day-long visit with several lab heads, and later made the largest offer of $525/month.  In Houston, the Texaco lab did a superficial interview and offered $450/month. At the impressive Shell Oil Co. lab near Houston, the interviewer posed a question that required thorough familiarity with the use of the binomial theorem, which Cook could not answer at that time (the interviewer was educated in Europe), so they made no offer. In San Antonio, Bill Mussen, head of Geophysics at the Southwest Research Institute (whose start-up literature Cook had seen at Penn State), showed a new organization and a fascinating project that needed him: evaluating new oil-finding inventions. They drove him to the hotel, and offered $500/month. Cook had reservations about working for Bill Mussen ("a dapper fellow, he seemed stuffy, on a different wavelength somehow") but accepted the job.

Southwest Research Institute 
Southwest Research Institute (SwRI) was founded by Tom Slick, one of the heirs of a millionaire oil wildcatter, on a big ranch west of San Antonio. Tom was an idealistic young man, hoping to provide a permanent asset to the region in return for what it had given to his father. He gave the land, with a
few buildings, and about a million dollars for initial operations. SwRI was and is a non-profit organization like a university, but supports itself with research contracts from the government and industry.

The Bulletin 
Cook's initial assignment was to take over a Bulletin service, titled "New and Unorthodox Methods of Petroleum Exploration". This service was supported by six oil companies who received the periodic Bulletins, considered confidential and proprietary. It had been expected initially that "new" oil-finding methods would be referred to the Bulletin for study by client oil companies, but this happened rarely or never.  So Cook sought out the unconventional techniques by following up leads from research and ads in oil and gas trade journals. He arranged to meet with proponents to see their ideas and equipment in action, traveling the Western states, and attended geophysical and oil trade conventions and exhibits. Cook became president of the San Antonio Geophysical Society for a year, and worked on the national convention of his main professional society, the Society of Exploration Geophysicists (SEG).  Cook published several papers in the SEG journal, "Geophysics", which proved a very good way to publish his findings relating to exploration.

Some local lawyers asked SwRI for a physicist to be an 'expert witness' on an auto accident case, and Cook was appointed. He was able to discredit an opposing 'expert' because he'd misread some trigonometric tables. Cook's lawyers won, and gave him $500 for this day in court. He was asked to help in other cases, but Bill Mussen objected to this, so Cook withdrew.

To maintain his 'second profession' of teaching, Cook taught math in night school at the San Antonio College for two years, including trig, analytical geometry and calculus. The College wanted him to continue teaching there, but he felt it was at the cost of his research.

In the three years Cook operated the Bulletin service he improved the composing and printing, and he'd done major analyses of several unconventional techniques, which appeared to have some scientific basis or were being seriously considered by several oil companies.  These included Surface Geochemistry, Gamma-ray Profiling, Radoil (profiles of the strength of radio waves), and Elfiex (which generated and measured sub-audio electric waves in the ground). In each of these cases, Cook not only observed field surveys by the proponents (in some cases for months), but studied all pertinent published theory and results, and sometimes did extensive model and field experiments of his own. The major conclusion Cook reached was that the ground is very difficult to 'see through' by any physical process provided by nature, and that the conventional seismic reflection method was by far the best at that time.

Cook found numerous variations of technique practiced by various proponents of radio-wave profiling; each man or group believed sincerely that his variation HAD produced anomalies or signals clearly correlated with deposits of oil.  Such correlation was, to Cook, very hard to demonstrate. He found that in previous years, similar variations had been demonstrated in surface geochemistry and in radioactivity profiling, also with ambiguous results. He made a statistical study of the probability of finding oil, and included it in one Bulletin; it turned out that ANY method, even flipping a coin, will generally be right if it predicts "No Oil Here"... if you spend a fortune drilling, it will be a "dry hole". Then there were the practitioners of sympathetic magic, who naturally were attracted to petroleum prospecting by the hope of fantastic wealth. Most had no technical
education and fell under immediate suspicion through their misuse of technical terms; some written claims were laughable.  One man had attached a razor blade to a coat-hangar dowsing rod "to cut the lines of force". Some claimed to have special, secret powers. These Cook gave a full and sympathetic hearing, and a careful performance test in the field; he found none who could perform as claimed. One
gentleman, who styled himself "Doctor", had a crude diploma from a well-known mail-order diploma mill. Cook reported on them one and all, with his frank evaluation in the Bulletin, and sent each one a copy of his report on their method. This dissuaded no one; some continued to try to 'convert' him for years.

After three years, Bill Mussen and Cook agreed that they had not found anything promising, nor were likely to, so ended the Bulletin service. Cook published a full account in "Geophysics" and issued three bound volumes to clients, containing all the issues.

As the Bulletin service was ending Mussen sold a contract to the U.S. Army Corps of Engineers (Fort Belvoir, Va.) to develop new methods of detecting buried, non-metallic land mines. Cook was in charge of this work for the next three years. It was classified Confidential, as a military job, and Cook's Secret clearance from the RadLab was again useful. Cook developed a theory and experiment for an electric-current technique with magnetic sensing, which gave trouble. He also developed a thermal radiation method and did lengthy tests with a flake-thermistor detector, the best far-infrared detector then available. He and a SwRI electronics technician (Joe Wormser) tried acoustic/seismic methods, and evolved one technique that was fairly promising. They continued to improve instruments and techniques over the years, but could never defeat the many 'false anomalies' produced by variations of tilt and height of the detector, and by inhomogeneities naturally present in the ground. Eighteen years later their reports were declassified, and Cook published a research paper.

The Start of Major Travels; Greenland and Mexico

Patents 

 US# 2,252,552 - Luminescent Coating Issued August 12, 1941.
 US# 2,372,359 - Luminescent Target Issued March 27, 1945.
 US# 2,461,144 - Electrical Storage Device (memory) Issued Feb 8, 1949.
 US# 2,885,633 - Electrical Crevasse Detector Issued May 5, 1959. The prototype was used in Greenland and Antarctica during the International Geophysical Year.
 US# 3,717,864 - Periodic Event Detector System Issued February 20, 1973.
 US# 4,004,268 - In-line Stress/Strain Detector Issued January 18, 1977.
 US# 4,012,649 - Piezoelectric Stress/Strain Intrusion Detectors Issued March 15, 1977.

Associations 

 Local Section President, Senior Member, American Astronautical Society
 Local Section President, Society of Exploration Geophysicists
 Local Section President, Sigma Xi: The Scientific Research Society
 Member, Sigma Pi Sigma
 Member, American Geophysical Union

Publications 

Laboratory Tests of Electrolog Resistivity Interpretation  John C. Cook, The Producers Monthly, Volume 13, No. 1, January, 1949, Pages 97–107.
Characteristics of Reservoir Models by Resistivity Logging  John C. Cook, The Producers Monthly, Volume 14, No. 5, October 27, 1949, Pages 24–28.
Can Gravity Be Abolished?  John C. Cook, Mineral Industries, Volume 19, No. 6, March 1950, Lead article, Penn State College.
NOTE: On December 1, 1949, the Gravity Research Foundation of New Boston, NH, which operates in connection with the Sir Isaac Newton Library of the Babson Institute, gave three awards for the best 2,000 word essays on the possibilities of discovering some partial insulator, reflector, or absorber of gravity waves.  The contest was open to professors, assistant professors, instructors, or members of the senior class of any listed college, and others who were especially interested in the subject.  There were 88 essays submitted, and the essay "Can Gravity Be Abolished?" submitted by Cook won third award. (and $250)
An Analysis of Airborne Surveying for Surface Radioactivity  John C. Cook, Doctoral Thesis, Division of Geophysics and Geochemistry, Pennsylvania State University.  Also published in Geophysics, Volume 17, No. 4, August 1951, Pages 687–706.
New and Unorthodox Methods of Petroleum Exploration John C. Cook, Three-volume book, Southwest Research Institute, 1952.
Scintillation Counters and Airborne Prospecting  John C. Cook, Conference - Uranium Prospecting series, March 1955, Pages 28–33.
An Electrical Crevasse Detector  John C. Cook, Geophysics, Volume 17, No. 4, October, 1956, Pages 1055–1070.
Some Observations in a Northwest Greenland Crevasse  John C. Cook, American Geophysical Union Transactions, Volume 37, No. 6, December, 1956, Pages 715–718.
Instruction Manual for Electrical Crevasse Detector, Engineering Test Model (Experimental) No. 2A,  For Antarctic Use By:  Task Force 43 U.S. Navy John C. Cook, Southwest Research Institute, Contract# Nby-13001, SwRI Project # 14-659-6, July 19, 1957.
The Design of a Crevasse Detector for Polar Exploration John C. Cook, Journal of the Franklin Institute, Volume 264, Issue 5, November 1957, Lead article, Pages 361–378.
Summary of Work of the U.S. I.G.Y. Airborne Traverse Unit, 1957-1958  John C. Cook, Symposium on Antarctic Research, International Geophysical Year, The Topography of the Sub-Glacial Continent, February 18, 1958, pp 6–8
Preliminary Airlifted Geophysical Explorations in Antarctica  John C. Cook, Glaciological Report Series, International Geophysical Year, no. 1, August 1958, pp II-1 – II-12
Some Unorthodox Petroleum Exploration Methods John C. Cook,  Geophysics, Vol. 24, No. 1, February 1959, pp 142–154.
Electrostatic Lift for Space Vehicles John C. Cook,  Ballistic Missile and Space Technology, vol II, 1960, pp 203–241, Academic Press NY.
RF Electrical Properties of Salty Ice and Frozen Earth John C. Cook, Journal of Geophysical Research, vol 65, no. 6, June 1960, pp 1767–1771.
Calorimeter and Accessories for Very High Thermal Radiation Flux Measurements John C. Cook, (Herman Levin, Sandia Corp., co-author), Review of Scientific Instruments, American Institute of Physics, vol 31, no. 10, October 1960, pp 1160–1161.
Proposed Monocycle-Pulse VHF Radar for Airborne Ice and Snow Measurement John C. Cook, Communication and Electronics, no. 51, and	Journal of the American Institute of Electrical Engineers, Transactions on Communication and Electronics, vol 79, November 1960, Lead article, pp 588–594
The Gravitation Phenomenon and its Energy Implications John C. Cook, Medical and Biological Aspects of the Energies of Space, 1961, pp 154–175.
Some Operating Characteristics of Flash-pumped Ruby Lasers John C. Cook, Proceedings of the IRE (Institute of Radio Engineers), vol 49, no. 10, October 1961.
A Scanning Radiation Sampler for Imaging Furnaces John C. Cook, Temperature: Its Measurement and Control in Science and Industry, Applied Methods and Instruments, vol III, part 2, 1962, pp 1051–1061
Magnetic Effects and Properties of Typical Topsoils John C. Cook, Journal of Geophysical Research, vol 67, no. 2, February, 1962, pp 815–828  (Stanley L. Carts, Jr, US Army Engineering R&D Labs, co-author).
Geochemical and other 'Auras of Influence' and the Detection of Underground Objects John C. Cook, Proceedings - First Symposium on Detection of Underground Objects, Materials and Properties, US Army Engineering R&D Labs, Ft. Belvoir, VA, March 1962, pp 1–26.
Output Power and Possible Continuous Operation of Ruby Lasers John C. Cook, Proceedings of the Institute of Radio Engineers, vol 50, March, 1962, pp 330–331.
On Measuring the Phase Velocity of an Oscillating Gravitational Field John C. Cook, Journal of the Franklin Institute, vol 273, no. 6, June 1962, Lead article, pp 453–471.
Monocycle Radar Pulses as Environmental Probes John C. Cook, Proceedings of the Second Symposium on Remote Sensing of Environment, October 1962, pp 223–231, Institute of Science and Technology, University of Michigan, Ann Arbor.
A 400-KW Pressurized Arc Imaging Furnace John C. Cook, A.D.L. Conference on Imaging Techniques, Cambridge, MA, Thermal Imaging Techniques, October 4, 1962, pp 55–76, Plenum Press, NY.
Seismic Reconnaissance of an Ice-Covered Antarctic Sea John C. Cook, British Journal of Glacilology, Cambridge, vol 4, 1963, pp 559–568.
Fast-Response Thermistor Probes for Temperature Microstructure Studies at Sea' John C. Cook, The Review of Scientific Instruments, vol 34, no. 5, May 1963, pp 496–499 (Kern E. Kenyon, Scripps Inst. of Oceanography, co-author).Supplementary Gravity and Magnetic Data for McMurdo Sound and Victoria Land, Antarctica John C. Cook, Journal of Geophysical Research, vol 68, no. 10, May 15, 1963, pp 3331–3333.Progress in Mapping Underground Solution Cavities with Seismic Shear Waves John C. Cook, Society of Mining Engineers, Transactions, AIME vol. 229, March 1964, pp26–32.Seismic Mapping of Underground Cavities Using Reflection Amplitudes John C. Cook, Geophysics, vol XXX (30), no. 4, August 1965, pp 527–538.Seismic Delineation of Solution Cavities John C. Cook, Second Symposium on Salt, Northern Ohio Geological Society, Vol 2, 1966, pp 131–139.The Seismometer as a Hydrophone John C. Cook, Bulletin of the Seismological Society of America, vol 56, no. 5, October 1966, pp1177–1184.An Airborne, Ground-Penetrating Radar John C. Cook, ElectroMagnetic Exploration of the Moon, Proceedings of the Symposium, NASA-AMES Research Center, June 11, 1968.A Capacitive Coupling Electrical Method for Lunar Subsurface Exploration John C. Cook, ElectroMagnetic Exploration of the Moon, Proceedings of the Symposium, NASA-AMES Research Center, June 11, 1968.Traveling Seismic Soil Coupler Research John C. Cook, US Army Mobility Equipment Research and Development Laboratories Contract No. DAAK 02-68-C-0211, Technical Report No. 68-50, December 1968.NQR Borehole Logging for Evaporite Minerals John C. Cook, Third Symposium on Salt, vol 2, pp353–356, Northern Ohio Geological Society, 1970.Electromagnetic Exploration Within Salt Domes John C. Cook, Third Symposium on Salt, vol 2, pp386–390, Northern Ohio Geological Society (J.R. Clements, co-author), 1970.Ground Motion from Sonic Booms John C. Cook, Journal of Aircraft, vol 7, no. 2, March 1970, pp126–129  (Tom T. Goforth, co-author)Introductory Remarks John C. Cook, IEEE Transactions on Geoscience Electronics, vol GE-8, no. 3, July 1970, pp117RF Electrical Properties of Bituminous Coal Samples John C. Cook.  Geophysics, vol. 35, No. 6, December 1970, pp. 1079–1085.Rapid Measurement of Subsurface Moisture and Frost by the 'Capacitive' Method, from Landed Planetary Probes and Surface Vehicles John C. Cook, Geological Problems in Lunar and Planetary Research, AAS, 1971.Experience with an Infrared Ocean-Wave Meter John C. Cook, Presented at the Fourth Annual Offshore Conference, Houston, TX, Paper# OTC 1512, pp I-14 – I-20, May 3, 1972.Seeing Through Rock with Radar John C. Cook, Presented at the North American Conference on Rapid Excavation and Tunneling, Chicago Illinois, June 5, 1972.Radar Exploration Through Rock in Advance of Mining John C. Cook, Society of Mining Engineers, AIME Transactions, vol 254, June 1973, pp 140–146Semi-Remote Acoustic, Electric, and Thermal Sensing of Small Buried Nonmetallic Objects  John C. Cook,  IEEE Transactions on GeoScience Electronics, Vol. GE-11, No. 3, July 1973, pp 135–152, (J.J. Wormser, co-author).Yes, we can locate solution cavity boundaries John C. Cook, Fourth Symposium On Salt, vol 2, pp 27–31, Northern Ohio Geological Society, 1974.How to Locate Water Hazards in Salt Mine John C. Cook, Fourth Symposium On Salt, vol 2, pp 33–40, Northern Ohio Geological Society, 1974.Status of Ground-Probing Radar and Some Recent Experience John C. Cook, “Subsurface Exploration for Underground Excavation and Heavy Construction”, at the Proceedings of Engineering Foundation Conference, of the American Society of Civil Engineers, held at Henniker, NH, August 1974.Radar Transparencies of Mine and Tunnel Rocks John C. Cook.  Geophysics, Vol. 40, No. 5, October 1975, pp. 865–885, 1975.Geophysical Measurement System for Delineation of Channel Sands John C. Cook, US Department of the Interior, Bureau of Mines, Contract No. HO242014, Technical Report No. 76-2, May 1976.Geological Radar Experiments In S.E. Australia John C. Cook, Technical Report, under contract to BHP Mineral Exploration, Australian Iron & Steel Pty, Ltd, Clutha Development Co., Ltd, Esso Australia, Ltd, Joint Coal Board, CSIRO (Mineral Physics), Bellambi Coal Co, and MacQuarie University, August 1976.Borehole-Radar Exploration in a Coal Seam John C. Cook, Geophysics, vol 42, no 6, October 1977, pp 1254–1257.Electromagnetic Resonance Borehole Assay Logging John C. Cook, US Department of the Interior, Bureau of Mines, Contract No. JO265024, Technical Report No. 77-10, January 1978.The Memoirs of John C. Cook'' John C. Cook, self-published, January 28, 2005.

References

External links 

 American Men and Women of Science
 Penn State Newsletter - Alumni News
 Cook, Society of Exploration Geophysics
 Five years at the Radiation Laboratory

1918 births
2012 deaths
American agnostics
American geophysicists
Experimental physicists
University of Utah alumni
Eberly College of Science alumni
Massachusetts Institute of Technology faculty
American scientific instrument makers
Sustainability advocates
Green thinkers
American cosmologists
People from Afton, Wyoming